Robyn Douglass (born June 21, 1953) is a retired American actress and model.

Early life
The daughter of an Army doctor and hospital administrator, Robyn Douglass was born in Sendai, Japan. She began acting while attending a Catholic girls' school in Mountain View, California.

Career
Douglass's known acting career spanned 21 years, from 1978 to 1999. She was featured in the films Breaking Away, Romantic Comedy, and The Lonely Guy, and she had a recurring role on the television series Galactica 1980. Before all this, she had appeared on the cover of the December 1974 edition of Playboy.

Her Life As A Man
In 1984, Douglass appeared in the fact-based made-for-television comedy-drama film Her Life As A Man, an adaptation of "My Life As A Man," an article Carol Lynn Mithers had written for the Village Voice. Her character, Carly Perkins, was an aspiring female reporter who sought a sportswriting job on a national magazine whose editor was infamously chauvinistic and she disguised herself as a man, using the alias of Carl Parsons convincingly enough to be able to get the inside story she wanted.

Legal disputes
Nude and erotic photos of Douglass also appeared in the 1981 edition of Hustler, which led to her filing a lawsuit against the magazine. In the suit she claimed that the photos were published without her permission and portrayed her in a false light, including as a lesbian, which damaged her career as an advertising model. A jury ruled in her favor, but in 1985 the United States Court of Appeals for the Seventh Circuit reversed the judgment and ordered a new trial. The United States Supreme Court let the order stand without comment.

Marriage
On December 2, 2000, Douglass married criminal defense attorney Rick Halprin, known for representing high-profile clients, including Chicago crime boss Joseph Lombardo.

In 2002, the  sued Prairie Single Family Homes of Dearborn Park Association under the Civil Rights Act of 1968, claiming that the neighborhood association was allowing harassment of the couple because Halprin was Jewish. In 2004, the United States Court of Appeals for the Seventh Circuit reversed part of a lower court's dismissal of the case on narrow grounds.

Douglass divorced Halprin sometime before his death in 2013 and moved from Illinois to California, where she opened a bed-and-breakfast.

In 2020, Douglass released an audio memoir Messages for the Future: The Galactica 1980 Memoirs reflecting upon her career while commemorating the 40th anniversary of Galactica 1980, detailing her career and life, produced by Daniel Earnshaw and published by Explore Multimedia.

Filmography

References

External links
 

1953 births
20th-century American actresses
Female models from California
American film actresses
American television actresses
Living people
People from Sendai
21st-century American women